Anti-Chinese sentiment in Korea was created in the 21st century by cultural and historical claims of China and a sense of security crisis caused by China's rise.

History 

Anti-Chinese sentiment in the modern sense was manifested by classical liberals such as the 19th-century Gaehwa Party and the Independence Club. They opposed the classical conservatives' Little China ideology and supported 'anti-Chinese Korean nationalism', supported the construction of an "Independent State" (독립국가). Even now, South Korean modern liberals and modern progressives support "Great Korean Independence" (대한 독립) from such powers as the United States, China, and Japan, and North Korea's far-left nationalist likewise advocates "Independence" (주체) from neighboring powers.

In 1931, while Korea was dominated by Imperial Japan, there was a dispute between Chinese and Korean farmers in Wanpaoshan, Manchuria. It was highly sensationalized in the Japanese and Korean press, and used as propaganda to increase anti-Chinese sentiment. It caused a series of anti-Chinese riots throughout Korea, starting in Incheon on July 3 and spreading rapidly to other cities. Chinese sources estimate that 146 people were killed, 546 wounded, and a considerable number of properties were destroyed . The worst riot occurred in Pyongyang on July 5. In this effect, the Japanese had a considerable influence on sinophobia in Korea.

Starting in October 1950, the People's Volunteer Army fought in the Korean War (1950–1953) on the side of North Korea against South Korean and United Nations troops. The participation of the PVA made the relations between South Korea and China hostile. Throughout the Cold War, there were no official relations between capitalist South Korea and communist China until August 24, 1992, when formal diplomatic relations were established between Seoul and Beijing.

In the 1960s, South Korean laws directed against foreign property ownership, at a time when most foreign ownership was by ethnic Chinese, led to many Chinese emigrating from South Korea to Taiwan.

In modern South Korean politics, anti-China sentiment appears in both the left-right spectrum, but tends to be strong mainly in modern conservatives than in liberal-to-progressives. Anti-Chinese sentiment among modern conservatives in South Korea is linked to the anti-communism and Korean War trauma.

Recent history 

In the early 2000s, a dispute over the history of Goguryeo, which both Koreas and China claim as their own, caused tension between the two countries.

Anti-Chinese sentiments in South Korea have been on a steady rise since 2002. According to the Pew Global Attitude Project, favorable view of China steadily declined from 66% in 2002 to 48% in 2008, while unfavorable view of China rose from 31% in 2002 to 49% in 2008. According to polls by the East Asia Institute, positive view of China's influence declined from 48.6% in 2005 to 38% in 2009, while negative view of Chinese influence rose from 46.7% in 2005 to 50% in 2008.

During the Seoul leg of the 2008 Olympic torch relay, over 6,000 Chinese students clashed with protesters. Violence at the protests was mostly caused by nationalist Chinese people. Chinese demonstrators clashed with local activists who rallied to protest the torch relay, citing Beijing's discouraging treatment of North Korea defectors and the regime's crackdown on Tibetans' rioting for independence. With the result of these violent clashes in central Seoul, anti-Chinese sentiments in Korea aroused great indignation toward the Chinese people. The Ministry of Justice of South Korea indicated that it would punish all such demonstrators, regardless of nationality. The Government of South Korea is toughening visa regulations for Chinese students.

Relations further strained with the deployment of THAAD in South Korea in 2017, for which China started its boycott against Korea, causing Koreans to develop anti-Chinese sentiment over reports of economic retaliation by Beijing.

A study in 2018 by the Chinese Academy of Sciences showed anti-Chinese sentiments in South Korea is becoming serious, with the majority of South Koreans expressing positive sentiments towards the United States and negative sentiments towards China. This contradicts a previous study by the same institute in 2017 that South Korea, in the long term, will not be able to maintain an anti-US stance against Chinese and Russian retaliation. According to the study, since 2013, it has become a trans-generational and trans-political trend in South Korea where the younger generation in their 20s have higher perceptions of China as a threat than the older generation in their 60s. The study deduced three factors behind anti-Chinese sentiments in South Korea, which are cold war ideology, nationalism and China threat theory. According to its analysis, anti-Chinese sentiments first began to rise with the Northeast Project in 2004, and took a decisive turn for the worse in the THAAD conflict in 2017.

According to a poll released by the Institute for Peace and Unification Studies at Seoul National University in 2018, 46 percent of South Koreans find China as the most threatening country to inter-Korean peace (compared to 33 percent for North Korea), marking the first time China was seen as a bigger threat than North Korea since the survey began in 2007.

Anti-imperialism 
Chinese government argues that South Korea's anti-Chinese and anti-Japanese sentiment is an "inferiority complex" caused by the two major powers, China and Japan. However, most South Koreans believe that anti-Chinese sentiment is caused by China's hegemony and imperialism. Even South Korea's far-left revolutionary socialists, including Workers' Solidarity, criticize China as an imperial state. (Korea has long been plagued by Chinese and Japanese imperialism.) 

Due to the anti-imperialist sentiment of the South Korean people, South Korean TV dramas often portray Chinese and Japanese people negatively. Some progressive nationalist-biased media outlets argue that Koreans' use of racial contempt for American, Chinese and Japanese people is not racist/racial discrimination because it is a legitimate opposition to minjok hierarchy and anti-imperialist expression.

The centre-left liberal Hankyoreh also pointed out that China's "roughly and unconscientious patriotism" (거칠고 인하무인식 애국주의) is the cause of South Korea's anti-Chinese sentiment.

In North Korean government 

Many experts analyzed that the relationship between North Korea and China is different from that between South Korea and the United States, and North Korea tends to place great importance on its independence and sovereignty from all major powers. 

According to a 2018 article in Radio Free Asia, the North Korean government is encouraging anti-Chinese sentiment among its people. Kim Jong-un is known to often say, "Japan is an enemy for 100 years, but China is an enemy for 1,000 years". South Korean liberals believe the North Korean government wants to cooperate with the U.S. because North Korean government fears China or Japan more than the United States.

Cultural hostility
On October 13, 2020, RM, a member of the South Korean K-pop group BTS, made a speech about the Korean War, where he reflected on South Korea's shared history with the United States through the pains and losses from the war. On social media, there was criticism from Chinese nationals against BTS for leaving out China's role in the civil war (during which it sided with North Korea to fight against South Korea). In response, negative sentiments toward China rose in South Korea, as Koreans viewed the Chinese response as exaggerating the situation without contextualizing RM's statement.

The 2022 Winter Olympics saw a deterioration of the relationship between China and the South Korean people. During the opening ceremony, China has raised a controversy among South Korean public as an Hanbok was displayed during the ceremony. The display has caused uproar among South Korean public and politicians calling it "cultural appropriation". The relationship worsened following the Men's 1000 metre short-track speedskating event incident which in South Korean skaters Hwang Dae-heon and Lee June-seo were disqualified. South Korea later filed a protest to International Skating Union, which the ISU rejected. The Korean Sport & Olympic Committee later filed an official appeal to the Court of Arbitration for Sport. In Seoul, a small scaled protest erupted in front of the Chinese Embassy in Seoul with protesters was seen tearing the Chinese flag and shouting anti-Chinese slogans.

See also 
 Anti-Imperialism
 Anti-sadaejuui
 Anti-Chinese sentiment
 Anti-Japanese sentiment in Korea
 Anti-Korean sentiment in China
 Anti-Americanism#Mexico
 Anti-Russian sentiment#Poland
 Conservatism in South Korea
 Ilminism
 People Power Party
 K-Trumpism
 Liberalism in South Korea - Anti-Chinese sentiment in South Korea appears in almost all political camps for different reasons. It is for reasons of rejection of the race and culture of a country that has been alien and historically threatening to Korea in conservative camps, and rejection of Chinese imperialism/hegemonism in liberal camps.
 Voluntary Agency Network of Korea

References 

 
China–Korea relations
Anti-communism in South Korea
 
Conservatism in South Korea
Postcolonialism